KiMs is a Danish brand of chips and snacks, owned by the Orkla Group.

The brand "KiM" was trademarked in 1960 by Odense Marcipanfabrik (a marzipan factory) in Denmark, but as a German cigarette brand of this name already existed, the name was changed to "KiMs" in 1965. In 1991 the company was sold to Nora Industrier, and the KiMs division was made into a stock company. The year after, KiMs became part of the Norwegian Orkla Group when Nora and Orkla merged. In 2013 KiMs No became a part of Orkla Confectionery & Snacks No, and KiMs DK became a part of Orkla Confectionery & Snacks DK.

Products include ordinary chips with either salt, salt and pepper or paprika seasonings, KiMs Minimal with less fat and either sea salt or paprika seasoning, KiMs Delivio made with olive oil and salt, sea salt and pepper or red and green paprika seasonings, KiMs Chips O'Hoi with sea salt and KiMs Mexican Fiesta. KiMs also manufactures two types of tortilla chips branded as KiMs Mexos with either salt or cheese seasoning as well as a number of other snacks including popcorn, bacon chips, french fries and potato sticks. Dip is available in salsa, guacamole, holiday, tortilla, tzatziki and garlic flavours.

Food and drink companies of Denmark
Danish brands
Brand name snack foods
Orkla ASA
Danish companies established in 1961